HCU may refer to:

Universities 
 Heritage Christian University, in Florence, Alabama, United States 
 Hiroshima City University, in Japan
 Houston Christian University, in Texas, United States
 Hsuan Chuang University, in Hsinchu City, Taiwan
 Huachiew Chalermprakiet University, in Samut Prakan, Thailand
 Hyderabad Central University, in India

Other uses 
 Heavy Conversion Unit, of the Royal Air Force
 Homocystinuria
 Hyundai Chungun High School, in Dong-gu, Ulsan, South Korea